Peter Tavy is a village  along the A386, North-East of Tavistock, Devon, England; it is named after the River Tavy. St Peter's Parish Church is largely built of granite and has a buttressed west tower.

Near Peter Tavy Moor, marked by a granite post, is the grave of George Stephens (d. 1763), who is said to have committed suicide after losing the prospect of marriage to Mary Bray, a farmer's daughter. He was buried outside the parish boundary, as was the custom for suicides, and it is said that his ghost still haunts the nearby moor to this day.

At Willsworthy is a former manor house with a chapel (converted into a house).

References

External links

Villages in Devon
Dartmoor